The Sejny synagogue is a former synagogue in Sejny, Poland, also called the White Synagogue in Sejny.

History

The large, Neo-baroque style building on Pilsudskiego Street was erected in the 1860s, replacing an older building.  It was used by the Nazis as a fire station, the interior was gutted and all furnishings were destroyed.  It was restored - with a plain, modern interior - in 1987 and now serves as a cultural center, theater and museum.

Called the Borderland Foundation (Fundacja Pogranicze), the foundation and its cultural center are dedicated to the cultures of the region: Polish, Lithuanian, Belarusian, Jewish, Ukrainian and Russian.  A Klezmer band is based at the cultural center.

The nineteenth century yeshiva building also survives, and is also used by the Borderland Foundation.

Images
 Nineteenth century postcard of Sejny synagogue and yeshiva:

External links
 Borderland Foundation:

References

Former synagogues in Poland
Baroque Revival synagogues
Sejny County
Buildings and structures in Podlaskie Voivodeship
Holocaust locations in Poland